Thue et Mue is a commune in the department of Calvados, northwestern France. The municipality was established on 1 January 2017 by merger of the former communes of Bretteville-l'Orgueilleuse (the seat), Brouay, Cheux, Le Mesnil-Patry, Putot-en-Bessin and Sainte-Croix-Grand-Tonne.

Population

See also 
Communes of the Calvados department

References 

Communes of Calvados (department)
Populated places established in 2017
2017 establishments in France